Nikola Kováčiková (born January 6, 1999) is a Slovak basketball player for Calpoly Univerzity and the Slovak national team.

She participated at the EuroBasket Women 2017.

References

1999 births
Living people
Slovak women's basketball players
People from Levice
Sportspeople from the Nitra Region
Guards (basketball)